"How Old Are You?" is a 1984 Italo disco song by Italian singer Miko Mission. It was the biggest hit from the artist.

References 

1984 songs
1984 singles
Italo disco songs